Children of Paradise is a collection of poetry by American poet Liz Rosenberg

Poems Included
Admiring Sylesh 
After The Death Of A Neighbor's Child 
All Those Hours Alone  
In The Dark Be The One 
Because I Was Dying 
The Birthday Party 
The Black Shoe 
The Blue-flowered Bell 
Charity 
College Days 
The Crucified 
The Dalai Lama 
Dark Eyes 
The Dark Side 
Darkness With Flashes Of Light 
The Details 
Ecco Homo 
Fairy Tales 
Fireworks 
The First Child Martyr At Illinois Elementary 
If Love Is Like Rain, Why Does That Tragic Woman 
In The Country Of Dreamers 
Intensive Care Unit 
A Lesson In Anatomy 
The Little Red Shoe 
The Method 
My Husband Takes A Photograph Of Me 
New Days 
The New Life 
The Newborns 
The Noble Corpse 
Pentimento 
The Plum Seed 
The Poem Of My Heart 
Pregnancy, First Trimester 
The Recitation 
The Silence Of Women 
Since Only Desire Is Infinite 
The Suffering 
Susquehanna Country 
The Terrible Ones 
Third First Snow 
Van Gogh's Potato Eaters 
A Vanished World 
The Wedding 
Where Were You 
Wild World

1994 poetry books
American poetry collections